The Casino de Madrid (Spanish: Casino de Madrid) is currently located in Madrid, Spain on number 15 Calle de Alcalá. It was born as a social club in 1836, outside of politics and with the intention of being a place where its members could congregate in peace. It was declared Bien de Interés Cultural in 1993.

History
The year 1836 is the official start of the club's activities because it was then it was endowed, for the first time, with internal statutes and regulations. The Casino arose at a time in which the spirit of association was appearing in Europe.  This period was marked by the creation of new societies that abandoned the traditional 18th century institutional model based on enlightened academies that were created for the recreation of the upper classes. The Casino had in its beginnings in several venues, all of them located throughout diverse premises in central Madrid. The name of the society also underwent changes, starting as simply Casino, later being designated Casino del Príncipe (due to its initial location on calle del Príncipe), until finally adopting the name "Casino de Madrid". The austere decoration of the first Society location was replaced by progressively more elegant and luxurious locales. The birth of the Casino coincided with a political period of transition in which the liberal state arose in Spain from the Old Regime. Hence the Casino, being a liberal organization, became a model to follow in provincial capitals in the Spain of the late 19th century.

It would not be until the year 1910 (after a long construction process that lasted five years) that it would move into its current headquarters on Calle de Alcalá, just when the casino was reaching a thousand members. This casino venue is a richly decorated building that offers various luxury social services to its club members. The headquarters of the Casino became a space for the representation of the Madrid elite of the time, capable of generating social capital among its members. The premises of Calle de Alcalá were, in short, a meeting point for the club members. At the end of the 20th century, it underwent a period of decline which was escaped by a rethinking in the management of the Society: The coexistence of the activity of the partners with private social activities managed by a concession company called Gran Círculo. This company is in charge of the operation of some of the services of the Casino. In 1993 the building and its content were declared an Bien de Interés Cultural. At present it is a space that hosts various social events, such as celebrations, conferences, and official visits. All of them coexisting with the society of current club members.

References 

Buildings and structures in Sol neighborhood, Madrid
Casinos in Spain
Bien de Interés Cultural landmarks in Madrid
Calle de Alcalá